Brigadier-General Arthur Frank Umfreville Green  (born 1878) was a senior British Army officer in World War I and author of several publications.

Military career 
Green was deployed in Flanders and in Italy. He served as a quartermaster general with the XI Corps and was part of the Inter-Allied Commission at the Spa Conference of 1920. From 1920 to 1924 he was commanded to Malta. In World War II he commanded the 4th battalion of the Sussex Home Guard.

Works 
As Down Of Thistle (1904) under the Pen name Arthur Wenlock.
The Countermine (1905) under the Pen name Arthur Wenlock.
Landscape sketching for military purposes, London, Hugh Rees, 1908.
Evening Tattoo, 1940.
The British Home Guard Pocket-Book, 1940.
Questions Answered about Rifle Shooting, 1945.

References 

1878 births
British Army generals of World War I
Year of death missing
British Home Guard officers
Companions of the Order of St Michael and St George
Companions of the Distinguished Service Order
British Army personnel of the Second Boer War
British Army brigadiers